Sayakbay Karalaev (1894 – 7 May 1971) was a Soviet and Kyrgyz storyteller and manaschi - a reciter of the epic Kyrgyz poem Manas.

References 

1894 births
1971 deaths
People from Semirechye Oblast
People's Artists of Kyrgyzstan
Recipients of the Order of the Red Banner of Labour
Manaschis
Storytellers
Kyrgyzstani poets
Soviet male poets

Soviet military personnel of the Russian Civil War